Stylist is a magazine for women that is published in the United Kingdom since 7 October 2009. There is currently a monthly print edition, as well as a website and weekly newsletters.

Ella Dolphin is CEO, and Lisa Smosarski is Editor-in-Chief. Stylist was previously published by Shortlist Media Ltd, and after the closure of the print edition of ShortList, Shortlist Media rebranded as 'The Stylist Group'.

Audience and content
Stylist targets affluent 20 to 40-year-old female commuters with high end content that includes fashion, travel, beauty, people and careers news. The magazine aims to take an intelligent approach, covering a broader range of culture and tackling issues women face in their professional and personal lives.

Stylist has featured Hollywood stars Angelina Jolie, Penélope Cruz, Jennifer Lopez and Jennifer Aniston on the cover as well as Hillary Clinton, comedian Tina Fey, activist X González and classicist Mary Beard.
The magazine has commissioned children's author and illustrator Quentin Blake and artist Rob Ryan to create bespoke front covers.

The advertisers of the magazine include Escada, Hugo Boss, Guerlain and Yves Saint Laurent.

Stylist magazine has an average distribution of 365,000 copies per issue.

Stylist hosts regular Stylist Network Events, including Stylist Live, which includes career-focused talks with business entrepreneurs, as well as curated shopping and fitness workouts, where an average of 200 Stylist readers buy tickets to attend the London-based sessions.

Distribution and expansion
Stylist is distributed free every month in London, Manchester, Leeds, Edinburgh, Glasgow, Liverpool and Birmingham, as well as in French Connection stores, airport lounges, city centre offices and gyms. It is also available by subscription, on Apple News and via the app.

In September 2010 Stylist launched its website, the online home of Stylist Magazine, featuring all of the latest lifestyle, fashion, beauty, travel, wellness & entertainment news, all through a feminist lens.
 
In April 2019 Stylist launched Stylist Loves, a daily email covering fashion, beauty, current affairs and work advice.

In April 2013, Stylist launched a weekly edition in France, in a joint venture between Groupe Marie Claire and Shortlist Media, which was distributed free every Thursday in nine cities including Paris, Lyon, Marseille, Aix‐en‐Provence, Toulouse, Bordeaux, Nantes, Lille and Strasbourg.

Stylist magazine was previously available in a tablet edition, but this was discontinued in 2016 after the closure of Apple Newsstand.

During the COVID-19 pandemic, Stylist ceased producing paper copies of the magazine and switched to an online-only model as members of the public were encouraged to stay at home during the lockdown.

Subscription products
In early 2021 Stylist launched a paid content fitness platform Strong Women Training Club, offering 1 and 12 month subscription options. It offers various training plans at beginner, intermediate and expert levels.

An online version of the digital magazine was launched mid-2021 to help readers access the content during the COVID-19 pandemic. It offers 3, 6 and 12 month subscription options.

Awards
Awards include:

 Launch of the Year 2010, BSME
 Media Woman of the Future: Stylist's editor Lisa Smosarski, Women of the Future Awards
 New Product of the Year 2010, Growing Business Awards
 Brand of 2010, Brand Republic
 Winner of Johnson & Johnson Best Weekly Beauty Journalist

References 

2009 establishments in the United Kingdom
Fashion magazines published in the United Kingdom
Weekly magazines published in the United Kingdom
Free magazines
Magazines established in 2009
Women's fashion magazines
Women's magazines published in the United Kingdom
Magazines published in London